Wilberg is a surname. Notable people with the surname include:

Christian Wilberg (1839–1882), German painter
Mack Wilberg (born 1955), composer, arranger, conductor, music director of the Mormon Tabernacle Choir
Sverre Wilberg (1929–1996), Norwegian actor
Hermann Wilberg (1880–1946), German mining engineer

See also
Wilberg Mine, coal mine in Emery County, Utah, approximately 12 miles northwest of Orangeville